John McLachlan may refer to:

 John McLachlan (architect) (1843–1893), Scottish architect
 John McLachlan (bishop) (1826–1893), Scottish Roman Catholic clergyman
 John McLachlan (composer) (born 1964), Irish composer
 John McLachlan (politician) (1840–1915), New Zealand Member of Parliament
 John MacKean McLachlan, British socialist politician

See also
 Jon McLachlan, New Zealand rugby player